The talharpa, also known as a tagelharpa (tail-hair harp) or the stråkharpa (bowed harp), is a four-stringed bowed lyre from northern Europe. It is questionable whether it was formerly common and widespread in Scandinavia. Today it is played mainly in Estonia, particularly among Estonian Swedes who came to Estonia around the 10th century from the Swedish part of Finland; they likely took the instrument with them (later Swedish settlers in Estonia did not use the talharpa.) It is similar to the Finnish jouhikko and the Welsh crwth. The instrument is still known in Finland.

The name talharpa probably comes from the word  ('pine tree'), as it is said also to be "pine harph" or "tagel" – horsehair – from which the strings were made.

Background
The earliest known Norse literary mentions of a harp or lyre date to the Eddic poem Völuspá, though not as a bowed instrument. In Nordic countries, the bowed lyre (as opposed to the plucked harp) has continued in Finland, where it is called  and Estonia where it is called .

Construction techniques
Talharpas were traditionally built by hollowing out a single block of wood and gluing a soundboard on top, as demonstrated by various historical finds.
In modern times, many tagelharpa makers continue to build their musical instruments from solid wood, such as Rauno Nieminen. Others began to make tagelharpas following the classical school of lutherie, with each part assembled and characterized by reinforcements, bands, counter-bands, figured bottoms and blocks.

Modern use
The talharpa is sometimes used in modern folk music, most notably by the Estonian nu-folk duo Puuluup who use talharpas and modern live looping.

Another band that often uses the tagelharpa and the Kravik lyre is the neo-folk band Wardruna, with frontman Einar Selvik, which for years has been involved in rediscovering Scandinavian and Baltic folk music.

Hungarian artist Vvilderness used talharpa on album Path.

See also
Crwth
Jouhikko
Gue
Byzantine lyra (bowed lyre) 
Hiiu kannel 
Bowed string instrument

References

External links

Estonian musical instruments
Bowed lyres